The following outline is provided as an overview of and topical guide to free software and the free software movement:

Free software – software which can be run, studied, examined, modified, and redistributed freely (without any cost). This type of software, which was given its name in 1983, has also come to be known as "open-source software", "software libre",  "FOSS", and "FLOSS". The term "Free" refers to it being unfettered, rather than being free of charge.

Large free software projects 
GNU Project
Linux
Berkeley Software Distribution

Free software by type

Free and open-source software packages (by type)
 Comparison of free off-line GPS software
 Comparison of free software for audio
 Free statistical software
 Free television software
 Free web application software

Free software products
 List of free software project directories
 List of formerly proprietary software
 List of Linux distributions
 List of Ubuntu-based distributions
 List of open source software packages
 Comparison of open source wireless drivers
 List of open source statistical packages
 List of trademarked open source software
List of free and open-source Android applications 
List of free and open-source software packages
List of free software web applications

Operating system families
 Comparison of open-source operating systems
AROS 
BSD 
Darwin 
eCos 
FreeDOS 
GNU 
Haiku 
Inferno 
Linux 
Mach 
MINIX 
OpenSolaris 
Plan 9 
ReactOS

Open-source software development products 

Basic For Qt 
Eclipse
F#
Free Pascal
FreeBASIC
Gambas
GCC
Java 
LLVM 
Lua 
NetBeans 
Open64 
Perl 
PHP 
Python 
ROSE 
Ruby 
Tcl
TypeScript

Free software movement 

Alternative terms for free software
Debian Social Contract
Free-software licence
Gratis versus Libre
Open source
Open-source definition
Open-source software
Open-source-software movement
Comparison of open source and closed source
Comparison of open-source software hosting facilities
Open standard
Long-term support
Software Package Data Exchange

Challenges 
Proprietary software
Proprietary device driver ("binary blobs")
Free and open-source graphics device driver
Proprietary firmware
Secure boot
Hardware restrictions
Digital rights management
License proliferation
Software patents and free software
SCO–Linux controversies
Mozilla software rebranded by Debian
Open-source software security
Trusted Computing

Free software licenses

Specific licenses 
Apache 
Artistic 
Beerware
Boost Software License
BSD licenses
CC0 
GNU General Public License 
GNU Lesser General Public License 
ISC license 
MIT License 
Mozilla Public License 
Ms-PL/RL 
WTFPL
zlib License

License types and standards
Comparison of free and open-source software licenses
Contributor License Agreement 
Copyleft
Debian Free Software Guidelines 
Definition of Free Cultural Works
Free license
The Free Software Definition
The Open Source Definition
Open-source license
Permissive free software licence
Public domain
Viral license

History of the free software movement

Free Software Foundation
SCO-Linux controversies
Open Source Initiative
History of GNU 
History of Haiku 
History of Linux 
History of the Linux kernel
Mozilla 
History of Mozilla Application Suite 
History of Firefox 
History of Mozilla Thunderbird
Timeline of free and open-source software

Events 
List of free-software events

Organizations 

.NET Foundation
Android Open Source Project
Apache Software Foundation
Blender Foundation
The Document Foundation
Eclipse Foundation
F Sharp Software Foundation
Free Software Foundation
Free Software Foundation Europe
Free Software Foundation of India
Free Software Foundation Latin America
FreeBSD Foundation
freedesktop.org
Free Software Movement of India
GNOME Foundation
GNU Project
Google Code
KDE e.V.
Linux Foundation
Mozilla Foundation
Open Knowledge Foundation
Open Source Geospatial Foundation
Open Source Initiative
Outercurve Foundation
Software Freedom Conservancy
SourceForge
Symbian Foundation
X.Org Foundation
Xiph.Org Foundation
XMPP Standards Foundation

Persons influential in the free software movement

Well known scholars 
 Lawrence Lessig
 John Gilmore
 Eben Moglen
 Eric S. Raymond

Other leading personalities 

 Rick Adams
 Eric Allman
 Brian Behlendorf
 Keith Bostic
 Alan Cox
 Miguel de Icaza
 Theo de Raadt
 Jim Gettys
 Jon Hall
 Jordan Hubbard
 Lynne Jolitz
 William Jolitz
 Rasmus Lerdorf
 Marshall Kirk McKusick
 Bram Moolenaar
 Ian Murdock
 Tim O'Reilly
 Keith Packard
 Brian Paul
 Bruce Perens
 Bob Scheifler
 Mark Shuttleworth
 Richard Stallman
 Linus Torvalds
 Andrew Tridgell
 Guido van Rossum
 Larry Wall

See also 

 Category
 Commons
 Portal

External links 

 The Free Software Definition
 Transcripts about Free Software by FSFE
 Free Software Magazine, which bills itself as "a free magazine for the free software world."
 Free cultural works definition
 FLOSSWorld - Free/Libre/Open-Source Software: Worldwide impact study, to find out more about the recently announced European Union funded study.
 Software Freedom: An Introduction, by Robert J. Chassell

 
Free software
Free software